Marphurius or Marforio (Medieval) is one of the talking statues of Rome. Marforio maintained a friendly rivalry with his most prominent rival, Pasquin. As at the other five "talking statues", pasquinades—irreverent satires poking fun at public figures—were posted beside Marforio in the 16th and 17th centuries.

The statue and its location
Marforio is a large 1st century Roman marble sculpture of a reclining bearded river god or Oceanus, which in the past has been variously identified as a depiction of Jupiter, Neptune, or the Tiber. It was the humanist and antiquarian Andrea Fulvio who first identified it as a river god, in 1527. The Marfoi was a landmark in Rome from the late 12th century. Poggio Bracciolini wrote of it as one of the sculptures surviving from Antiquity, and in the early 16th century it was still near the Arch of Septimius Severus, where the various authors reported it.

The origin of its name is a matter of some debate.  It was discovered with a granite basin bearing the inscription mare in foro, but may take its name from the Latin name for the area in which it was discovered (Martis Forum), or from the Marioli (or Marfuoli) family who owned property near the Mamertine Prison, also near the forum, where the statue was sat until 1588.

Pope Sixtus V had the statue moved to the Piazza San Marco, (in Rome) in 1588, and then to the piazza del Campidoglio in 1592, where it decorates a fountain designed by Giacomo della Porta on a wall of the Basilica di Santa Maria in Ara Coeli, facing the Palazzo dei Conservatori. Part of the face, the right foot, and the left hand holding a shell were restored in 1594. In 1645, the building of the Palazzo Nuovo enclosed the fountain in its courtyard.

See also
The Scior Carera in Milan.

Notes

Bibliography
Rendina, C., "Pasquino statua parlante”, ROMA ieri, oggi, domani, n. 20, February 1990.

External links
Roma Segreta: Marforio  
Marforio
The Insider's Guide to Rome, p.73
Chambers' Edinburgh Journal, p.106
Marforio

Fountains in Rome
Talking statues of Rome
1st-century Roman sculptures
Rome R. X Campitelli
Sculptures of gods